Li Ruiying  (born 16 July 1961) is a Chinese media personality and politician, best known for being the long-time anchor of the CCTV program Xinwen Lianbo.

Ruiying is the Vice-President of China Association of Radio and Television and China Hosts Association, and the Chairman of the Broadcast, China Central Television. Li was a delegate to the 18th National Congress of the Communist Party of China and the All-China Youth Federation, and a member of the 9th, 10th, 11th National Committee of the Chinese People's Political Consultative Conference.

Biography
Ruiying was born in Beijing in July 1961, with her ancestral home in Nanle County, Henan.

Ruiying was graduated from Communication University of China in 1983, majoring in broadcasting.

After graduation, Ruiying worked in Jiangsu Television. She was transferred to Communication University of China as a teacher in 1986, then she joined the China Central Television. Li anchored the Xinwen Lianbo since 1989. Li also appeared briefly at the CCTV New Year's Gala in 2008 during the winter storms to read a poem with other television and film personalities.

Ruiying and fellow anchor Zhang Hongmin left Xinwen Lianbo in May 2014. She was subsequently said to have begun pursuing work in television anchor training. Some overseas Chinese-language news outlets have linked Ruiying's departure from Xinwen Lianbo to the corruption case surrounding former official Ling Jihua, though this has not been confirmed.

At CCTV Ruiying was said to have earned 280,000 yuan a month, which is roughly equivalent to an annual salary of $530,000 a year.

Personal life
In 1987, Ruiying was married to a Chinese scholar, Zhang Yuyan, who is a researcher in Chinese Academy of Social Sciences, the couple have a son.

References

1961 births
Chinese television personalities
People's Republic of China politicians from Beijing
Communication University of China alumni
Living people
CCTV newsreaders and journalists